Heinz Küstner (1897 — 1963) was a German gynecologist and obstetrician who helped develop the Prausnitz-Küstner test while an assistant of Otto Prausnitz. He died after years of accidental inoculation from his own experiments with antibodies and infectious agents isolated after gynecologic operations in 1931.

References

German gynaecologists
1897 births
1931 deaths